This is a list of islands of Connecticut. The list does not include named minor rock outcroppings, former islands that are now connected to the mainland by landfill, or false islands that are connected by thin slivers of land to the mainland. Unless otherwise indicated, listed islands are in Long Island Sound.

Islands

Connecticut